Fraser is a city in Macomb County of the U.S. state of Michigan.  The population was 14,480 at the 2010 census. The city is part of the Metro Detroit region.

History
The Village of Fraser was incorporated by an act of the state legislature in 1894. The city was named for a lawyer from Detroit named Alexander J. Frazer. The City of Fraser was established by home rule charter November 7, 1956, and adopted by the electors on December 26, 1956.

Geography
The city is nearly square, bordered by 15 Mile Road, Kelly Road, 13 Mile Road, and Hayes Road.

Demographics

2010 census
As of the census of 2010, there were 14,480 people, 6,105 households, and 3,954 families living in the city. The racial makeup of the city was 92.0% White, 3.9% African American, 0.5% Native American, 1.5% Asian, 0.3% from other races, and 1.8% from two or more races. Hispanic or Latino of any race were 2.1% of the population.

There were 6,105 households, of which 29.0% had children under the age of 18 living with them, 46.4% were married couples living together, 14.1% had a female householder with no husband present, 4.3% had a male householder with no wife present, and 35.2% were non-families. 31.4% of all households were made up of individuals, and 14.5% had someone living alone who was 65 years of age or older. The average household size was 2.36 and the average family size was 2.96.

The median age in the city was 42.9 years. 21.4% of residents were under the age of 18; 7.8% were between the ages of 18 and 24; 24.1% were from 25 to 44; 30.6% were from 45 to 64; and 16.2% were 65 years of age or older. The gender makeup of the city was 46.4% male and 53.6% female.

2000 census
As of the census of 2000, there were 15,297 people, 6,062 households, and 4,122 families living in the city. The racial makeup of the city was 96.67% White, 0.91% African American, 0.26% Native American, 0.93% Asian, 0.01% Pacific Islander, 0.21% from other races, and 1.01% from two or more races. Hispanic or Latino of any race were 1.33% of the population.

There were 6,062 households, out of which 31.7% had children under the age of 18 living with them, 53.0% were married couples living together, 12.5% had a female householder with no husband present, and 32.0% were non-families. 28.2% of all households were made up of individuals, and 12.7% had someone living alone who was 65 years of age or older.  The average household size was 2.49 and the average family size was 3.08.

In the city, the population was spread out, with 24.2% under the age of 18, 7.9% from 18 to 24, 29.1% from 25 to 44, 23.4% from 45 to 64, and 15.4% who were 65 years of age or older.  The median age was 39 years. For every 100 females, there were 87.1 males.  For every 100 females age 18 and over, there were 81.8 males.

The median income for a household in the city was $50,339, and the median income for a family was $64,119. Males had a median income of $50,243 versus $29,254 for females. The per capita income for the city was $22,864.  About 3.4% of families and 4.2% of the population were below the poverty line, including 5.3% of those under age 18 and 4.4% of those age 65 or over.

Education
Fraser Public Schools is the public school system in Fraser. The district scores above the state average on the MEAP Test.

Also located in Fraser is the Arts Academy in the Woods, a free public charter academy dedicated to students interested in pursuing fine and performing arts.

Sports

In 2006, the girls' varsity basketball team, coached by David Kuppe, became the 2nd Macomb County girls' basketball team to make it to the state finals.

In 1981, Fraser's football team was led by Mark Garalczyk to the State Championships.

Notable people

 Entertainer and Las Vegas icon, the Amazing Johnathan
 Former Indianapolis Colts quarterback Jim Sorgi
 Former Carolina Hurricanes Stanley Cup winner Chad LaRose
 Former Jacksonville Jaguars and Purdue tight end Charles Davis
 Former Cy Young Award winner Pat Hentgen
 Former Major League Baseball pitcher Joe Decker
 Musician Jason Hartless
 Founder of the Fruehauf Corporation August Charles Fruehauf
 Actress Maribeth Monroe
 Screenwriter/Comic Book Creator Rylend Grant

Climate
This climatic region is typified by large seasonal temperature differences, with warm to hot (and often humid) summers and cold (sometimes severely cold) winters.  According to the Köppen Climate Classification system, Fraser has a humid continental climate, abbreviated "Dfb" on climate maps.

References

External links

Official city website
History of the City 

Cities in Macomb County, Michigan
Populated places established in 1956
1956 establishments in Michigan